Ihor Oleksandrovych Kalinin (Ukrainian: Ігор Олександрович Калінін; born December 28, 1959) is a former Ukrainian politician who served as Advisor to the President of Ukraine from 2013–2014 and Head of the Security Service of Ukraine from 2012-2013.

On March 5, 2014, the Council of the European Union froze the bank accounts of several Ukrainian politicians who are suspected of misusing budget funds, including Kalinin and former president Viktor Yanukovych, who Kalinin served as an advisor to.

References 

1959 births
Directors of the Security Service of Ukraine
Colonel Generals of Ukraine
Russian emigrants to Ukraine
Living people
Politicians from Moscow
KGB officers
Russian individuals subject to European Union sanctions